Marie Thérèse de Bourbon (1 February 1666 – 22 February 1732) was the titular Queen consort of Poland in 1697. She was the daughter of the Prince of Condé. As a member of France's reigning House of Bourbon, she was a princesse du sang.

Biography
Marie Thérèse de Bourbon, was born at the Hôtel de Condé in Paris on 1 February 1666 to Henri-Jules de Bourbon, prince de Condé, the then Duke of Bourbon, and Princess Anne Henriette of the Palatinate. Known from birth as Mademoiselle de Bourbon, she was named after the queen, Maria Theresa of Spain (wife of King Louis XIV of France).

On her father's side she belonged to a cadet branch of the French royal House of Bourbon, and on her mother's side, from English royalty and the House of Nassau.

It was planned for her to marry the Italian Emmanuel Philibert of Savoy, Prince de Carignan, but on 22 January 1688, Marie-Thérèse married François Louis, Prince of Conti, le Grand Conti, head of the Conti cadet branch of the House of Bourbon, in the chapel of Versailles.

The bride was passionately in love with her husband, but his attentions were elsewhere. It was well known at court that he had an affair with his wife's sister-in-law, the Duchess of Bourbon; it was also said that he had homosexual tendencies and did not pay his wife much attention.

Marie Thérèse had a difficult relationship with her children and, as a result, lived quietly at the various Conti residences, mainly at the Château de L'Isle-Adam. The family later reconciled after the death of the Prince de Conti. Marie Thérèse was known for her quiet personality and her piety, much praised by many at court. Elizabeth Charlotte of the Palatinate, Dowager Duchess of Orléans and mother of the Regent Philippe d'Orléans, wrote of the widowed Marie Thérèse:

Queen of Poland
In 1697, Marie Thérèse's husband was offered the Crown of Poland by Louis XIV. The Prince de Conti went to Poland to inspect his potential new kingdom, while Marie Thérèse stayed in France. During this time, she was considered the titular Queen of Poland and her husband the king. Based on votes that cast by the Polish nobility, her husband was the more popular candidate, but when he arrived in Gdańsk, he found that Augustus II the Strong had taken his place on the throne, and so he returned to France.

Dowager princess
In 1709, her husband died in Paris. In order to tell the widows apart after the death of their respective husbands, the dowager Princesses of Conti were each accorded the title of Douairière preceded by the number corresponding to the order in which they had been consort to the head of the Bourbon-Contis, e.g., Madame la Princesse de Conti première douairière. In 1727 the two dowager Princesses de Conti were joined by a third, Louise Élisabeth de Bourbon.

After the death of her husband, she started to renovate the Parisian home of the Conti family, the Hôtel de Conti on the Quai de Conti on the left bank of the Seine.

In 1713, her daughter Marie Anne married Louis Henri, Duke of Bourbon, known as Monsieur le Duc, the son of her husband's former mistress Louise-Françoise de Bourbon, Princess de Condé On the same day, in a double wedding ceremony at Versailles, her son, the new Prince de Conti, married another child of the Princess de Condé, Louise Élisabeth de Bourbon, who then took the title that Marie Thérèse had had for almost thirty years.

On 27 December 1718, when the building was still incomplete and unoccupied, she sold it to her brother-in-law and sister (Louis Auguste, Duke of Maine and Louise Bénédicte de Bourbon), who hired a new architect, Armand-Claude Mollet, to redesign and complete it, after which it became known as the Hôtel du Maine (destroyed 1838).

Marie Thérèse died on 22 February 1732 at the Hôtel de Conti, probably due to the syphilis she had contracted from her husband. She was buried at the Église Saint-André des Arcs, in L'Isle d'Adam.

Through her granddaughter Louise Henriette de Bourbon-Conti, Duchess d'Orléans, grandmother of Louis Philippe, King of the French, Marie Thérèse is an ancestor of several of Europe's 19th and 20th century monarchs.

Issue
Marie Anne de Bourbon (18 April 1689 - 21 March 1720) married Louis Henri, Duke of Bourbon but had no issue.
Prince of La Roche-sur-Yon (18 November 1693 - 22 November 1693), died in infancy.
Prince de La Roche-sur-Yon (1 December 1694 - 25 April 1698), died in childhood.
Louis Armand de Bourbon, Prince de Conti (10 November 1695 - 4 May 1727) married Louise Élisabeth de Bourbon-Condé and had issue.
Louise Adélaïde de Bourbon (2 November 1696 – 20 November 1750) died unmarried.
Mademoiselle d'Alais (19 November 1697 - 13 August 1699), died in childhood.
Louis François de Bourbon, Count d'Alais (27 July 1703 - 21 January 1704), died in infancy.

Ancestry

References

1666 births
1733 deaths
Nobility from Paris
Princesses of Conti
House of Bourbon-Condé
17th-century French nobility
18th-century French nobility
Princesses of the Blood